Mary Movsisyan is an Armenian operatic soprano, soloist at the Armenian National Opera and worldwide.

Biography 

Mary Movsisyan was born in Yerevan, Armenia. In 2010, she graduated from Yerevan State Conservatory (vocal class of professor Anna Sarajeva) with honors. In 2011, she completed a master's degree with excellence and received a golden medal and a special prize in the Darclee competition of young singers, Romania. Later she became a laureate and took the first prize in the Tatevik Sazandaryan classic vocal competition. In 2014 she participated in the Queen Elizabeth International Competition in Belgium.

For many years Movsisyan took part in vocal lessons for young singers from CIS in the Academy in Belarus organized by Yuri Bashmet and received vocal classes by professor Svetlana Nesterenko and Dmitry Vdovin. In 2011, after finishing Summer International School in Moscow Conservatory (class of professor Peter Gluboki), she pursued the participation in the Rising Stars in the Kremlin Festival in Moscow, Russia. The festival was accompanied by the Moscow Virtuosi chamber orchestra headed by conductor Vladimir Spivakov and received a Certificate of Gratitude from Svetlana Medvedeva, then the first lady of the Russian Federation.

Movsisyan has attended master classes from Mirella Freni in Italy, from Axel Everaert in Netherlands, from Barbara Frittoli and Dale Fundling in Yerevan and many others. In 2011, she was a participant in the Moscow Meets Friends Festival. In the same year, Movsisyan took part in the concert for young singers of Armenia in St John's, Smith Square, London. Since 2013, Movsisyan has been a soloist in the Yerevan Opera Theatre where she has performed the roles of Micaëla in Carmen, Anoush in Anoush, Pamina in The Magic Flute, Manon in Manon, Violetta in La traviata and many others.

In 2018, she participated in Orlando festival Kerkrade in Netherlands. Movsisyan has had several performances also at the Dubai Opera House, at the Kuwait Opera Centre, etc.

Repertoire

Operas

Oratorio and symphonic pieces

References

External links

Living people
Musicians from Yerevan
Armenian operatic sopranos
Year of birth missing (living people)
21st-century Armenian women opera singers